Hadmatiya (JN) is a village in Rajkot District, Gujarat, India.

References 

Villages in Rajkot district